Saoud Fath Al Katheiri  is a Qatar football defender who played for Qatar in the 2000 Asian Cup. He also played for Al Gharrafa, Al Ittihad and Rapid Wien.

External links

1980 births
Living people
Qatari footballers
Qatari expatriate footballers
Qatar international footballers
Expatriate footballers in Austria
Qatari expatriate sportspeople in Austria
Austrian Football Bundesliga players
SK Rapid Wien players
Al-Gharafa SC players
Al Sadd SC players
Qatar Stars League players
2000 AFC Asian Cup players
2004 AFC Asian Cup players
Place of birth missing (living people)
Association football defenders